There are 210 named mountain ranges in Arizona.This list also includes mountain ranges that are mostly in New Mexico and Sonora, Mexico, that extend into Arizona.

Alphabetical list
The southeast of Arizona, with New Mexico, northwest Chihuahua and northeast Sonora contain insular sky island mountain ranges, (the Madrean Sky Islands), or smaller subranges in association. There are also numerous Sonoran Desert ranges, or Arizona transition zone ranges. Northern and northeast Arizona also has scattered ranges throughout.

Agua Caliente Mountains–Yuma County and Maricopa County
Agua Dulce Mountains–Pima County
Aguila Mountains–Yuma County
Ajo Range–Pima County
Alvarez Mountains–Pima County
Aquarius Mountains–Mohave County
Artesa Mountains–Pima County
Artillery Mountains–Mohave County
Atascosa Mountains–Santa Cruz County
Aubrey Hills–Mohave County
Baboquivari Mountains–Pima County
Batamote Mountains–Pima County
Bates Mountains–Pima County
Beaver Dam Mountains–Mohave County
Belmont Mountains–Maricopa County
Big Horn Mountains (Arizona)–Maricopa County
Big Lue Mountains–Greenlee County
Bill Williams Mountains–Mohave County
Black Hills (Greenlee County)–Greenlee County
Black Hills (Yavapai County)–Yavapai County
Black Mesa (Arizona) -- (E. Navajo County & W. Apache County)
Black Mountains (Arizona)–Mohave County
Black Mountains (Yavapai County)–Yavapai County-(southwest county)
Blackjack Mountains (Arizona)–Gila County
Bradshaw Mountains–Yavapai County
Brownell Mountains–Pima County
Bryan Mountains–Yuma County
Buck Mountains–Mohave County
Buckhorn Mountains–Yavapai County
Buckskin Mountains (Arizona)–La Paz County
Buckskin Mountains (Arizona-Utah)–Coconino County -- (S. Kane County, Utah)
Butler Mountains–Yuma County
Cabeza Prieta Mountains–Yuma County
Camelback Mountain– Maricopa County
Canelo Hills–Santa Cruz County
Carrizo Mountains–Apache County
Casa Grande Mountains–Pinal County
Castle Mountains–Pima County
Castle Dome Mountains–Yuma County
Cerbat Mountains–Mohave County
Cerro Colorado Mountains–Pima County
Chiricahua Mountains–Cochise County
Chocolate Mountains (Arizona)–La Paz County
Chuska Mountains–Apache County
Cimarron Mountains–Pima County
Connell Mountains–Yavapai County
Copper Mountains–Yuma County
Cottonwood Mountains–Mohave County
Coyote Mountains (Arizona)–Pima County
Crater Range–Maricopa County
Crooked Mountains–Pima County
Date Creek Mountains–Yavapai County
Diablo Mountains (Arizona)–Pima County
Dome Rock Mountains–La Paz County
Dos Cabezas Mountains–Cochise County
Dragoon Mountains–Cochise County
Dripping Spring Mountains–Pinal County
Eagletail Mountains–Maricopa County
Empire Mountains–Pima County
Gakolik Mountains–Pima County
Galiuro Mountains–Graham County -- (SE. Pinal County)
Gila Bend Mountains–Maricopa County
Gila Mountains (Graham County)–Graham County
Gila Mountains (Yuma County)–Yuma County
Goldfield Mountains–Maricopa County
Granite Mountains (Arizona)–Pima County–see also: Granite Mountain (Arizona)-(Yavapai County)a separate "Granite Mountain" is in s. La Paz County
Granite Wash Mountains–La Paz County
Grayback Mountains–Yavapai County
Growler Mountains–Pima County
Guadalupe Mountains (Hidalgo County)–Hidalgo County, NM - (Cochise County, AZ & Sonora, Mexico)
Harcuvar Mountains–NE. La Paz County -- (SW. Yavapai County)
Harquahala Mountains–E. La Paz County -- (W. Maricopa County)
Hayes Mountains–Gila County
Hieroglyphic Mountains–N. Maricopa County -- (some in S. Yavapai County)
Hobble Mountains–Coconino County
Huachuca Mountains–Cochise County
Hualapai Mountains–Mohave County
John the Baptist Mountains–Pima County
Juniper Mountains–Yavapai County
Kofa Mountains–N. Yuma County - (S. La Paz County)
La Lesna Mountains–Pima County
Laguna Mountains (Arizona)–Yuma County (see also: Laguna Mountains(Calif))
Las Guijas Mountains–Pima County
Little Ajo Mountains–Pima County
Little Buckskin Mountains–La Paz County
Little Dragoon Mountains–Cochise County
Little Harquahala Mountains–La Paz County
Little Horn Mountains–S. La Paz County -- (N. Yuma County)
Little Rincon Mountains–Cochise County
Lukachukai Mountains–Apache County
Maricopa Mountains–Maricopa County
Mazatzal Mountains–Southeast Yavapai County -- (and N. Maricopa County, W. Gila County)
McAllister Range–Yavapai County
McCloud Mountains–Yavapai County
McCracken Mountains–Mohave County
McDowell Mountains–Maricopa County
Mescal Mountains–Gila County
Mesquite Mountains–Pima County
Middle Mountains–S. La Paz County -- (N. Yuma County)
Mineral Mountains, Arizona–Pinal County
Mingus Mountain, (= "Black Hills")–Yavapai County
Moccasin Mountains–Mohave County -- (S. Kane County, Utah)
Mohave Mountains–Mohave County
Mohawk Mountains–Yuma County
Mohon Mountains–Yavapai County
Moquith Mountains–Mohave County
Muggins Mountains–Yuma County
Mule Mountains–Cochise County
Music Mountains–Mohave County
Mustang Mountains–Santa Cruz County
Navajo Mountain, Arizona–Coconino County (mostly in Utah)
Natanes Mountains–Graham County
New River Mountains–Yavapai County & Maricopa County
New Water Mountains–S. La Paz County -- (connected to Kofa Mountains, N. Yuma County)
North Comobabi Mountains–Pima County
Painted Rock Mountains–Maricopa Count
Pajarito Mountains–Santa Cruz County
Palo Verde Mountains–Pinal County
Palomas Mountains–Yuma County
Patagonia Mountains–Santa Cruz County
Peacock Mountains–Mohave County
Pedrogosa Mountains–Cochise County
Peloncillo Mountains (Cochise County)–NE. Cochise County -- (SE. Graham County, S. Greenlee County)See also Peloncillo Mountains (Hidalgo County), New Mexico, also a Madrean Sky Island
Perilla Mountains–Cochise County
Phoenix Mountains–Maricopa County
Picacho Mountains–Pinal County
Pinal Mountains–Gila County
Pinaleno Mountains–Graham County
Plomosa Mountains–La Paz County
Poachie Range–SE. Mohave County -- (SW. Yavapai County, NE. La Paz County)
Pozo Redondo Mountains–Pima County
Pozo Verde Mountains–Pima County
Puerto Blanco Mountains–Pima County
Quijotoa Mountains–Pima County
Quinlan Mountains–Pima County
Rawhide Mountains–Mohave County
Rincon Mountains–Pima County
Roskruge Mountains–Pima County
Sacaton Mountains–Pinal County
Salt River Mountains
Salt River Mountains (Gila County)–Gila County
San Cayetano Mountains–Santa Cruz County
San Francisco Mountains–Greenlee County
San Francisco Mountains
San Francisco Mountains (New Mexico)–New Mexico & Greenlee County
San Francisco Peaks–Coconino County
San Luis Mountains–Pima County
San Tan Mountains, Arizona
Santan Mountains–Pinal County
Sand Tank Mountains–Maricopa County
Santa Catalina Mountains–Pima County
Santa Maria Mountains–Yavapai County
Santa Rita Mountains–Santa Cruz County, Pima County
Santa Rosa Mountains–Pima County
Santa Teresa Mountains–Graham County
Sauceda Mountains–Pima County
Sawmill Mountains–Mohave County
Sawtooth Mountains–Pinal County
Sevenmile Mountains, Arizona-Gila County
Sheridan Mountains–Pima County
Sierra Ancha–Gila County
Sierra Arida–Yuma County
Sierra Blanca Mountains–Pima County
Sierra de la Lechuguilla–Yuma County
Sierra de la Nariz–Pima County
Sierra de Santa Rosa–Pima County
Sierra Estrella–Maricopa County
Sierra Madre Occidental–Regional Western Mexico - (extension of individual ranges, along entire United States-Mexico border)
Sky island/ Madrean sky islands
Sierra Pinta–Yuma County
Sierra Prieta–Yavapai County
Sierrita Mountains–Pima County
Sikort Chuapo Mountains–Pima County
Silver Bell Mountains–Pima County
Silver Reef Mountains–Pinal County
Slate Mountains–Pinal County
Sonoyta Mountains–Pima County
South Comobabi Mountains–Pima County
South Mountains (Arizona)–Maricopa County
Suizo Mountains–Pinal County
Summit Mountains–E. Greenlee County -- (W. Grant County, New Mexico)
Superstition Mountains–Pinal County
Swisshelm Mountains–Cochise County
Table Top Mountains–Pinal County
Tank Mountains–Yuma County
Tat Momoli Mountains–Pinal County
Tinajas Altas Mountains–Yuma County
Tortilla Mountains–Pinal County
Tortolita Mountains–Pima County, Pinal County
Trigo Mountains–La Paz County
Tucson Mountains–Pima County
Tule Mountains–Yuma County
Tumacacori Mountains–Santa Cruz County, Pima County
Tunitcha Mountains–Apache County
Uinkaret Mountains–Mohave County
Usery Mountains–Maricopa County
Vekol Mountains–Pinal County
Virgin Mountains–N. Mohave County -- (E. Clark County, Nevada)
Vulture Mountains–Maricopa County
Waterman Mountains–Pima County
Weaver Mountains–Yavapai County
West Silver Bell Mountains–Pima County
Whetstone Mountains–Cochise County
White Mountains (Arizona)–Apache County
White Tank Mountains–Maricopa County
Whitlock Mountains–Graham County
Wickenburg Mountains–Yavapai County
Winchester Mountains–N. Cochise County -- (they merge into S. Galiuro Mountains, Graham County)
Yon Dot Mountains–Coconino County

Associated regional landforms

Aguirre Valley
Altar Valley
Aubrey Valley
Avra Valley
Black Mesa, Big Mountain, Mesa de las Vacas
Black Mesa (western Arizona), extreme south section: Black Mountains (Arizona)
Cactus Plain
Castle Dome Plain
Chinle Valley
Chino Valley (Arizona)
Coconino Plateau
Defiance Plateau
Echo Cliffs
Gila River Valley–from eastern to southwestern Arizona
Gila Valley (Graham County)
Gila Valley (Yuma County)
Grand Canyon
Grand Wash Cliffs
Grapevine Mesa
Growler Valley
Hualapai Valley
Hunts Mesa
Hurricane Cliffs
Hyder Valley
Kaibab Plateau
Kaibito Plateau
Kanab Plateau
King Valley (Arizona)
La Posa Plain
Lechuguilla Desert
Lonesome Valley, See: Chino Valley, Arizona, & Prescott Valley, Arizona (townsites)
Madera Canyon (Arizona)
Mogollon Plateau
Mogollon Rim
Mohawk Valley (Arizona)
Monument Valley
Natanes Valley
Painted Desert, Arizona
Palomas Plain
Paradise Butte
Paria Plateau, See: Paria Canyon-Vermilion Cliffs Wilderness
Parker Valley
Quijotoa Valley
Rainbow Valley (Arizona)
Ranegras Plain
Sabino Canyon
Sacramento Valley (Arizona)
Salt River Canyon
San Bernardino Valley (Arizona)
San Cristobal Valley
San Pedro Valley (Arizona)
San Simon Valley
Santa Rosa Valley
Sentinel Plain
Shivwits Plateau
Shonto Plateau
Sonoran Desert
Sonsela Butte
Sulphur Springs Valley
Sycamore Canyon
Tonto Basin
Tule Desert (Arizona)
Uinkaret Plateau
Valley of the Ajo
Verde Valley
Vermilion Cliffs
Whitlock Valley
Williamson Valley
Yuma Desert

Apache County

Black Mesa (Arizona) -- (E. Navajo County & W. Apache County)
Carrizo Mountains–Apache County
Chuska Mountains–Apache County
Lukachukai Mountains–Apache County
Tunitcha Mountains–Apache County
White Mountains (Arizona)–Apache County

Cochise County

Chiricahua Mountains–Cochise County
Pedrogosa Mountains–Cochise County
Swisshelm Mountains–Cochise County

Dos Cabezas Mountains–Cochise County
Dragoon Mountains–Cochise County
Little Dragoon Mountains–Cochise County
Guadalupe Mountains (Hidalgo County)–Hidalgo County, NM - (Cochise County, AZ & Sonora, Mexico)
Huachuca Mountains–Cochise County
Little Rincon Mountains–Cochise County
( Rincon Mountains–Pima County )
Mule Mountains–Cochise County
Peloncillo Mountains (Cochise County)–NE. Cochise County -- (SE. Graham County, S. Greenlee County)See also Peloncillo Mountains (Hidalgo County), New Mexico, also a Madrean Sky Island
Perilla Mountains–Cochise County
Whetstone Mountains–Cochise County
Winchester Mountains–N. Cochise County -- (they merge into S. Galiuro Mountains, Graham County)

Coconino County

Buckskin Mountains (Arizona-Utah)–Coconino County -- (S. Kane County, Utah)
Hobble Mountains–Coconino County
San Francisco Peaks–Coconino County
Yon Dot Mountains–Coconino County

Gila County

Blackjack Mountains (Arizona)–Gila County
Hayes Mountains–Gila County
( Mazatzal Mountains–Southeast Yavapai County -- (and N. Maricopa County, W. Gila County) )
Mescal Mountains–Gila County
Pinal Mountains–Gila County
Salt River Mountains (Gila County)–Gila County
Sevenmile Mountains–Gila County
Sierra Ancha–Gila County

Graham County

Galiuro Mountains–Graham County -- (SE. Pinal County)
Winchester Mountains–N. Cochise County -- (they merge into S. Galiuro Mountains, Graham County)
Gila Mountains (Graham County)–Graham County
( Gila Mountains (Yuma County)–Yuma County )
Natanes Mountains–Graham County
Peloncillo Mountains (Cochise County)–NE. Cochise County -- (SE. Graham County, S. Greenlee County)See also Peloncillo Mountains (Hidalgo County), New Mexico, also a Madrean Sky Island
Pinaleno Mountains–Graham County
Santa Teresa Mountains–Graham County
Whitlock Mountains–Graham County

Greenlee County
Big Lue Mountains–Greenlee County
Black Hills (Greenlee County)–Greenlee County
( Black Hills (Yavapai County)–Yavapai County )
Peloncillo Mountains (Cochise County)–NE. Cochise County -- (SE. Graham County, S. Greenlee County)See also Peloncillo Mountains (Hidalgo County), New Mexico, also a Madrean Sky Island
San Francisco Mountains (New Mexico)–New Mexico & Greenlee County
Summit Mountains–E. Greenlee County -- (W. Grant County, New Mexico)

La Paz County

Buckskin Mountains (Arizona)–La Paz County
Chocolate Mountains (Arizona)–La Paz County
Dome Rock Mountains–La Paz County
Granite Wash Mountains–La Paz County
Harcuvar Mountains–NE. La Paz County -- (SW. Yavapai County)
Harquahala Mountains–E. La Paz County -- (W. Maricopa County)
(Kofa Mountains–N. Yuma County - (S. La Paz County) )
Little Buckskin Mountains–La Paz County
Little Harquahala Mountains–La Paz County
Harquahala Mountains–E. La Paz County -- (W. Maricopa County)
Little Horn Mountains–La Paz County
Middle Mountains–S. La Paz County -- (N. Yuma County)
New Water Mountains–La Paz County
Plomosa Mountains–La Paz County
( Poachie Range–SE. Mohave County -- (SW. Yavapai County, NE. La Paz County) )
Trigo Mountains–La Paz County

Maricopa County

Agua Caliente Mountains–Yuma County and Maricopa County
Belmont Mountains–Maricopa County
Big Horn Mountains (Arizona)–Maricopa County
Crater Range–Maricopa County
Camelback Mountain– Maricopa County
Eagletail Mountains–Maricopa County
Gila Bend Mountains–Maricopa County
Goldfield Mountains–Maricopa County
Harquahala Mountains–E. La Paz County -- (W. Maricopa County)
Little Harquahala Mountains–La Paz County
Hieroglyphic Mountains–Maricopa County -- (some in S. Yavapai County)
Maricopa Mountains–Maricopa County
Mazatzal Mountains–Southeast Yavapai County -- (and N. Maricopa, W. Gila County) )
Four Peaks– Maricopa County 
McDowell Mountains–Maricopa County
New River Mountains–Yavapai County & Maricopa County
Painted Rock Mountains–Maricopa County
Phoenix Mountains–Maricopa County
Sand Tank Mountains–Maricopa County
Sierra Estrella–Maricopa County
Salt River Mountains–Maricopa County
Usery Mountains–Maricopa County -- (See: Usery Mountain Recreation Area.)
Vulture Mountains–Maricopa County
White Tank Mountains–Maricopa County
Shanagold Peaks–Maricopa County

Mohave County

Aquarius Mountains–Mohave County
Artillery Mountains–Mohave County
Aubrey Hills–Mohave County
( Beaver Dam Mountains–S. Washington County, Utah -- (N. Mohave County--Arizona Strip) )
Bill Williams Mountains–Mohave County
Black Mountains (Arizona)–Mohave County
Buck Mountains–Mohave County
Cerbat Mountains–Mohave County
Cottonwood Mountains–Mohave County
Hualapai Mountains–Mohave County
McCracken Mountains–Mohave County
Moccasin Mountains–Mohave County -- (S. Kane County, Utah)
Mohave Mountains–Mohave County
Moquith Mountains–Mohave County
Music Mountains–Mohave County
Peacock Mountains–Mohave County
Poachie Range–E. Mohave County -- (W. Yavapai County)
Rawhide Mountains–Mohave County
Sawmill Mountains–Mohave County
Uinkaret Mountains–Mohave County
Virgin Mountains–N. Mohave County -- (E. Clark County, Nevada)

Navajo County

Agathla Peak–Navajo County
Black Mesa (Arizona) -- (E. Navajo County & W. Apache County)

Pima County

Agua Dulce Mountains–Pima County
Ajo Range–Pima County
Alvarez Mountains–Pima County
Artesa Mountains–Pima County
Baboquivari Mountains (Arizona)–Pima County; See: Baboquivari Peak Wilderness
Batamote Mountains–Pima County
Bates Mountains–Pima County
Brownell Mountains–Pima County
Castle Mountains (Arizona)–Pima County
Cerro Colorado Mountains–Pima County
Cimarron Mountains–Pima County
Coyote Mountains (Arizona)–Pima County
Crooked Mountains–Pima County
Diablo Mountains (Arizona)–Pima County
Empire Mountains–Pima County
Gakolik Mountains–Pima County
Granite Mountains (Arizona)–Pima County–see also: Granite Mountain (Arizona)-(Yavapai County)a separate "Granite Mountain" is in s. La Paz County
Growler Mountains–Pima County
John the Baptist Mountains–Pima County
La Lesna Mountains–Pima County
Las Guijas Mountains–Pima County
Little Ajo Mountains–Pima County
Mesquite Mountains–Pima County
North Comobabi Mountains–Pima County
Pozo Redondo Mountains–Pima County
Pozo Verde Mountains–Pima County
Puerto Blanco Mountains–Pima County
Quijotoa Mountains–Pima County
Quinlan Mountains–Pima County – highest point is Kitt Peak
Rincon Mountains–Pima County
( Little Rincon Mountains–Cochise County )
Roskruge Mountains–Pima County
San Luis Mountains–Pima County
Santa Catalina Mountains–Pima County
Santa Rita Mountains–Santa Cruz County, Pima County
Santa Rosa Mountains (Arizona)–Pima County
Sauceda Mountains–Pima County
Sheridan Mountains–Pima County
Sierra Blanca Mountains–Pima County
Sierra de la Nariz–Pima County
Sierra de Santa Rosa–Pima County
Sierrita Mountains–Pima County
Sikort Chuapo Mountains–Pima County
Silver Bell Mountains–Pima County
West Silver Bell Mountains–Pima County & Pinal County
Sonoyta Mountains–Pima County
South Comobabi Mountains–Pima County
Tortolita Mountains–Pima County, Pinal County
Tucson Mountains–Pima County
Tumacacori Mountains–Santa Cruz County, Pima County
Waterman Mountains–Pima County
West Silver Bell Mountains–Pima County & Pinal County
Silver Bell Mountains–Pima County

Pinal County

Casa Grande Mountains–Pinal County
Dripping Spring Mountains–Pinal County
Galiuro Mountains–Graham County -- (SE. Pinal County)
Mineral Mountains, Arizona–Pinal County
Palo Verde Mountains–Pinal County
Picacho Mountains–Pinal County
Sacaton Mountains–Pinal County
San Tan Mountains, Arizona
Santan Mountains–Pinal County
Sawtooth Mountains–Pinal County
Silver Reef Mountains–Pinal County
Slate Mountains–Pinal County
Suizo Mountains–Pinal County
Superstition Mountains–Pinal County
Table Top Mountains–Pinal County
Tat Momoli Mountains–Pinal County
Tortilla Mountains–Pinal County
Tortolita Mountains–Pima County, Pinal County
Vekol Mountains–Pinal County
West Silver Bell Mountains–Pima County & Pinal County
( Silver Bell Mountains–Pima County )

Santa Cruz County

Atascosa Mountains–Santa Cruz County
Canelo Hills–Santa Cruz County, Cochise County
Mustang Mountains–Santa Cruz County
Pajarito Mountains–Santa Cruz County
Patagonia Mountains–Santa Cruz County
San Cayetano Mountains–Santa Cruz County
Santa Rita Mountains–Santa Cruz County, Pima County
Tumacacori Mountains–Santa Cruz County, Pima County

Yavapai County

Big Black Mesa–Yavapai County
Black Hills (Yavapai County)–Yavapai County
Black Hills (Greenlee County)–Greenlee County
Black Mountains (Yavapai County)–Yavapai County-(southwest county)
Bozarth Mesa–Yavapai County
Bradshaw Mountains–Yavapai County
Buckhorn Mountains–Yavapai County
Connell Mountains–Yavapai County
Date Creek Mountains–Yavapai County
Granite Dells–Yavapai County
Granite Mountain–Yavapai County
Grayback Mountains–Yavapai County
( Harcuvar Mountains–NE. La Paz County -- (SW. Yavapai County) )
( Hieroglyphic Mountains–N. Maricopa County -- (some in S. Yavapai County) )
Juniper Mountains–Yavapai County
Mazatzal Mountains–Southeast Yavapai County -- (and N. Maricopa County, W. Gila County)
McAllister Range–Yavapai County
McCloud Mountains–Yavapai County
Mingus Mountain, (= "Black Hills (Arizona)")–Yavapai County
Mohon Mountains–Yavapai County
New River Mountains–Yavapai County & Maricopa County
( Poachie Range–SE. Mohave County -- (SW. Yavapai County, NE. La Paz County) )
Santa Maria Mountains–Yavapai County
Sierra Prieta–Yavapai County
Weaver Mountains–Yavapai County
White Hills, Arizona–Yavapai County
Wickenburg Mountains–Yavapai County

Yuma County

Agua Caliente Mountains–Yuma County and  Maricopa County
Aguila Mountains–Yuma County
Bryan Mountains–Yuma County
Butler Mountains–Yuma County  -- (W. of Tinajas Altas Mountains-(minor length & elevation))
Cabeza Prieta Mountains–Yuma County
Castle Dome Mountains–Yuma County
Copper Mountains–Yuma County
Gila Mountains (Yuma County)–Yuma County
( Gila Mountains (Graham County)–Graham County )
Kofa Mountains–N. Yuma County - (S. La Paz County)
Laguna Mountains (Arizona)–Yuma County (see also: Laguna Mountains(Calif))
( Little Horn Mountains–S. La Paz County -- (N. Yuma County) )
Middle Mountains–S. La Paz County -- (N. Yuma County)
Mohawk Mountains–Yuma County
Muggins Mountains–Yuma County
( New Water Mountains–S. La Paz County -- (connected to Kofa Mountains, N. Yuma County) )
Palomas Mountains–Yuma County
Sierra Arida–Yuma County
Sierra de la Lechuguilla–Yuma County
Sierra Pinta–Yuma County
Tank Mountains–Yuma County
Tinajas Altas Mountains–Yuma County
Tule Mountains–Yuma County

New Mexico

Guadalupe Mountains (Hidalgo County)–Hidalgo County, NM - (Cochise County, AZ & Sonora, Mexico)
San Francisco Mountains (New Mexico)–New Mexico & Greenlee County

Mexico

Sonora

Guadalupe Mountains (Hidalgo County)–Hidalgo County, NM - (Cochise County, AZ & Sonora, Mexico)
Sierra Madre Occidental–Regional Western Mexico - (extension of individual ranges, along entire United States-Mexico border)
Sky island/ Madrean sky islands

See also

 List of mountain ranges of California
 List of mountain ranges of Nevada
 List of mountain ranges of the Lower Colorado River Valley
 List of mountains and hills of Arizona by height
 List of rivers of Arizona
 List of valleys of Arizona
 Madrean Sky Islands/ Sky island, a biome region of SE Ariz, SW New Mex, and Northern Mexico proper.

External links
 

Arizona, List of mountain ranges of
 
Arizona
Mountain ranges